Conocephalus saltans, known generally as prairie meadow katydid, is a species of meadow katydid in the family Tettigoniidae. Other common names include the western prairie grasshopper and wingless prairie grasshopper. It is found in North America.

References

saltans
Articles created by Qbugbot
Insects described in 1872